Valeriy Shapovalov is a Ukrainian retired footballer.

Career
He started playing football in his native Odessa. From 1993 to 1995 he played in the Odessa teams SC Odesa and "Dynamo-SKA". In 1996 he moved to Dnipro, where on October 26 of the same year in the game against Ternopil "Niva" he made his debut in the Premier League. Unable to become a player of the main team of Dnipro, Shapovalov continued his career in other teams of the top division: "Zvezda", Kryvbas Kryvyi Rih, Metalurh Zaporizhzhia. In total, he played 75 games in the top league of the Ukrainian championship, played a total of 241 matches for Ukrainian clubs at the professional level and scored 24 goals.

From 2003 to 2007 (with a break: 2004 - Belshina Bobruisk) he played in Kazakhstan in the teams Ordabasy Shymkent. He played 104 matches and scored 7 goals in the Super League. In 2008 he ended his playing career.

Coaching career
In 2009 he worked in the coaching staff of Eduard Glazunov in the team "Okzhetpes". From August 2009, after the removal of Glazunov, he led this team as and. at. head coach. He held this position until December of the same year, when Sergei Gerasimets was appointed coach of the team. In 2015 he was appointed assistant head coach of Kirovograd "Stars", where he worked until August 2016. Then he continued to work as an assistant to Sergei Lavrinenko in Petrovsky "Ingults"

References

External links 
 Valeriy Shapovalov footballfacts.ru
 Valeriy Shapovalov allplayers.in.ua

1976 births
Living people
FC Desna Chernihiv players
FC Dnipro players
FC Zirka Kropyvnytskyi players
FC Metalurh Zaporizhzhia players
FC Metalurh-2 Zaporizhzhia players
MFC Mykolaiv players
FC Ordabasy players
FC Belshina Bobruisk players
Ukrainian footballers
Ukrainian Premier League players
Ukrainian First League players
Ukrainian Second League players
Ukrainian expatriate sportspeople in Kazakhstan
Expatriate footballers in Kazakhstan
Ukrainian expatriate sportspeople in Belarus
Expatriate footballers in Belarus
Association football defenders
Footballers from Odesa